There have been seven video games based on The Addams Family television series and films, released between 1989 and 2022 on various home video game consoles.

Fester's Quest

The Addams Family

The Addams Family is a platform game released by Ocean in 1992. The game was released for TurboGrafx-16, Sega Mega Drive / Genesis, Super NES, Amiga and Atari ST. It is based on the 1991 movie of the same name.  Other titles based on the film were released for other platforms.

The characters bear resemblances to their movie counterparts.

The Addams Family: Pugsley's Scavenger Hunt

Addams Family Values

Addams Family Values is an action RPG based on the film of the same name produced by Ocean Software and released in 1995 for the Sega Mega Drive and Super NES.

The New Addams Family

The New Addams Family Series is an adventure video game released for Nintendo's Game Boy Color in 2001. It was developed by 7th Sense and published by Microids exclusively in Europe. Titus Interactive was going to release the game in America with the title The New Addams Family, but the American version was cancelled. It is based on The New Addams Family television series that ran from 1998 to 1999.

Story
The family mansion is going to be demolished and replaced by an amusement park, and therefore the family will be evicted. While the adults are trying to find a solution, the children roam the house helping out in their own peculiar way. Only if they find the estate ownership documents will the contractors can be stopped.

Gameplay
The player controls both Pugsley and Wednesday Addams, and must navigate the house, collecting items, solving puzzles and conversing with other members of the family.

The Addams Family Mystery Mansion
There is also a 2019 mobile game called The Addams Family Mystery Mansion for Android and iOS. It was produced by pixowl/Animoca Brands.

Story 
Morticia and Gomez return home to their mansion to find the rest of their family missing.

The Addams Family: Mansion Mayhem 
The Addams Family: Mansion Mayhem is a 3D platforming adventure game released on September 24, 2021 for the PlayStation 4, Nintendo Switch, PC, and Xbox One/Series X and S. It was developed by PHL Collective and published by Outright Games. The game's art and assets are based on 2019's The Addams Family and 2021's The Addams Family 2 films.

References

External links
 
 Fester's Quest at GameFAQs
 
 
 
 

 
Video games based on adaptations
1989 video games
Nintendo Entertainment System games
Video games scored by Barry Leitch
Video games scored by Naoki Kodaka
Video games developed in Japan
Video games developed in the United Kingdom